Ulysses is a 1954 fantasy-adventure film based on Homer's epic poem Odyssey. The film was directed by Mario Camerini, who co-wrote the screenplay with writer Franco Brusati.  The original choice for director was Georg Wilhelm Pabst but he quit at the last minute. The film's cinematographer Mario Bava co-directed the cyclops Polyphemus segment (uncredited).

In the film Silvana Mangano plays two roles, as Penelope, the faithful wife of Ulysses and the sorceress Circe. American star Kirk Douglas plays the Greek hero, Ulysses. Anthony Quinn plays Antinous.

Plot
The palace of Ulysses, king of Ithaca, is beleaguered by a horde of suitors wooing his wife Penelope after his failure to return from the war against the city of Troy. Penelope has promised under pressure to marry one of her many suitors, who under the leadership of Antinous squander her husband's wealth and land. She holds them off by telling them she first wants to finish her tapestry, but she unweaves it every night to stall. Telemachus, the son of Ulysses and Penelope, is sick of the suitors' behavior and decides to search for his father.

In the meantime, on the nearby island of Phaeacia, royal princess Nausicaa and her handmaidens find a shipwrecked man washed up on the shore. Due to his ordeal, the stranger has lost his memory, not even remembering his name. He is taken in by Nausicaa's parents, King Alcinous and Queen Arete, and in short time he and Nausicaa fall in love. Just on the day they are scheduled to be married, however, the stranger, longing to remember who he really is, returns to the shore and stares out to the sea. And as he does so, his lost memories begin to stir.

Gradually, the stranger remembers that he is Ulysses, who was lost at sea when his ship was blown off course in a storm during his return voyage to Ithaca, as a consequence of his desecrating Neptune's temple during the sacking of Troy. Going ashore on an unknown island to forage for food, they intrude on the cave of the cyclops Polyphemus, who locks them inside and then eats one of Ulysses' men. Upon the giant's complaint about the taste of human flesh, Ulysses suggests for Polyphemus to collect grapes for making wine. After Polyphemus leaves, Ulysses and his men prepare a stake to blind the cyclops after getting him drunk. The plan succeeds, and after Ulysses has taunted the blinded giant into removing the rock from the cave entrance, the Greeks make their escape.

Some time afterwards, Ulysses' ship passes the rock of the sirens. Eager to learn what they sound like, Ulysses has himself tied to the mast while his men plug their ears to resist their enchanting singing, and is tormented when the sirens speak to him with the voices of his family. After passing the rocks, a strange current pulls the ship towards another island. Leaving his men to explore, Uylsses returns to find them all missing, captured and transformed into pigs by the mistress of the island, the sorceress Circe. Circe, who has fallen in love with Ulysses after learning of his heroics, strives to keep him here, but Ulysses forces her to return his men to their original forms. Persuaded by Circe to stay for a while, he stirs resentment in his men, who want to return home. Ignoring Circe's warning that Neptune will strike them down if they leave, they set out to sea on their own and perish in a storm. Blaming Circe for allowing them to die, and determined to return to his family, Ulysses begins building a raft. Circe tries to make him stay and enjoy an eternal life by her side by calling forth the dead from the underworld, including Ulysses' crew and his lost comrades-in-arms from Troy. But then his recently deceased mother Anticlea appears before him, telling him of Penelope's plight. With Ulysses' resolve reaffirmed, the embittered Circe lets him go, daring him to defy Neptune's wrath.

With his memory fully restored, Ulysses reveals his identity and sets out for home, breaking Nausicaa's heart. Returning to his palace disguised as a beggar, he meets Penelope, pretending to be an old friend of her husband. Upon witnessing her despair and faithfulness for him, he suggests that she hold a contest to determine the suitor who shall marry her the next day: stringing Ulysses' hunting bow and fire an arrow through a dozen axe heads. As he turns to leave, he stops to pet his old hunting dog Argos. Telemachus, who has just returned, witnesses this, and he and Ulysses reveal themselves to each other.

The next day, Penelope stages the archery contest, with Ulysses attending in his disguise. When the suitors are unable to string the bow, Ulysses taunts them into letting him try and succeeds with his shot, thus revealing his identity. With the assistance of Telemachus and the servants still loyal to him, Ulysses locks down the feast hall and slays all the suitors. After the slaughter is complete, Ulysses reunites with Penelope to rebuild their long-strained bond.

Cast

See also
 List of historical drama films
 Greek mythology in popular culture
 Peplum (film genre)

References

External links
 

1954 films
1950s historical adventure films
1950s fantasy adventure films
Peplum films
1950s English-language films
English-language Italian films
1950s Italian-language films
Films directed by Mario Camerini
Films with screenplays by Ben Hecht
Films with screenplays by Irwin Shaw
Films produced by Dino De Laurentiis
Paramount Pictures films
Italian fantasy adventure films
Films based on the Odyssey
Films set in the Mediterranean Sea
Lux Film films
1950s historical fantasy films
Sword and sandal films
Italian historical adventure films
Films scored by Alessandro Cicognini
American fantasy adventure films
American historical fantasy films
English-language French films
French fantasy adventure films
French historical fantasy films
1950s American films
1950s Italian films
1950s French films